Gambler’s conceit is the fallacy described by behavioral economist David J. Ewing, where a gambler believes they will be able to stop a risky behavior while still engaging in it. This belief frequently operates during games of chance, such as casino games. The gambler believes they will be a net winner at the game, and thus able to avoid going broke by exerting the self-control necessary to stop playing while still ahead in winnings. This is often expressed as “I’ll quit when I’m ahead.”

Quitting while ahead is unlikely, though, since a gambler who is winning has little incentive to quit, and is instead encouraged to continue to gamble by their winning. Once in the throes of a winning streak, the individual may even become convinced that it is their skill, rather than chance, causing their winnings, or good luck is on their side, and thus it seems especially senseless to stop.

The gambler's conceit frequently works in conjunction with the gambler's fallacy: the mistaken idea that a losing streak in a game of chance, such as roulette, has to come to an end or is lowered because the frequency of one event has an effect on a following independent event.

Therefore, players think that it is necessary to continue playing while winning and necessary to continue playing while losing.

Relatedly, gambler's ruin shows that a player with finite resources continuously playing will inevitably go broke against a player with infinite resources in a fair or negative-expectation game. However, this is also true in a positive-expectation game if the player with finite resources continually plays and increases their stakes when winning, but does not reduce them when losing.

As casinos have a house advantage in games of chance, a casino is more likely over time to take a player's money than a player is to win money from the casino, and thus it is to the casino's advantage to keep a winning player playing. Casinos thus frequently encourage winning players to continue playing. An example can be seen in the Martin Scorsese movie Casino in which Robert De Niro's character ensures that a high-stakes gambler continues to gamble to ensure that the money returns to the casino. On a smaller scale, casinos offer players free alcoholic drinks to encourage them to keep gambling.

See also
 Behavioral economics
 Inverse gambler's fallacy
 Gambling
 Online gambling
Short (finance)

References

Gambling terminology
Behavioral economics
Luck
Causal fallacies